Arthur Shingler (10 September 1876 – 1 April 1958) was a South African cricketer. He played in five first-class matches for Border in 1902/03 and 1903/04.

See also
 List of Border representative cricketers

References

External links
 

1876 births
1958 deaths
South African cricketers
Border cricketers
Sportspeople from Qonce